Northampton Kings Heath Siemens Depot is an Electric Traction Depot located in Northampton, Northamptonshire, England. The depot is situated on the Northampton Loop Line and is north of Northampton station.

Allocation 
As of 2019, the depot's allocation consists of Class 319
and Class 350 Desiros.

References 

 Railway depots in England
 Rail transport in Northamptonshire